CT-4 or CT 4 can refer to:

 PAC CT/4
 Connecticut's 4th congressional district
 Connecticut Route 4
 ČT4 Sport, a Czech television channel
 Cadillac CT4
 Australian Information Technology Company - CT4